John Frederick Miller (1759–1796) was an English illustrator, mainly of botanical subjects.

Miller was the son of the artist Johann Sebastian Müller (1715 – c. 1790). Miller, along with his brother James, produced paintings from the sketches made by Sydney Parkinson on James Cook's first voyage. He accompanied Joseph Banks on his expedition to Iceland in 1772.

Miller published Cimelia Physica. Figures of rare and curious quadrupeds, birds, &c. together with several of the most elegant plants (1796) with text by George Shaw.

References 

1759 births
1796 deaths
English illustrators
British ornithologists
Scientific illustrators
British bird artists